Velvetleaf (or "velvet leaf", etc.) is a common name used for plants with soft-haired leaves:

 Abutilon theophrasti native to southern Asia
 Cissampelos pareira, native to tropical America
 Lavatera arborea, native to Europe
 Limnocharis flava, native to tropical America and introduced to southeast Asia